Jeff Jordan may refer to:

Sports
 Jeff Jordan (defensive back) (1943–2022), American football player
 Jeff Jordan (running back) (born 1945), American football player
 Jeff Jordan (bobsleigh) (born 1956), American Olympic bobsledder

Others
 Jeff Jordan (painter), American surrealist painter
 Jeff Jordan (venture capitalist), American venture capitalist

See also
 Jeffrey Jordan (born 1988), American former basketball player